Varun Chaudhary is an Indian politician and a member of 14th Haryana Legislative Assembly representing Mulana. He is a member of the Indian National Congress.

Personal life
Chaudhary was born to former Indian National Congress chief Phool Chand Mullana and hails from Ambala city of Haryana. He completed Bachelor of Laws from University of Delhi in 2006. Singh is a lawyer by profession.

Political career
In the 2019 Haryana Legislative Assembly election, Chaudhary represented Indian National Congress as a candidate from Mulana and went on to defeat Bharatiya Janata Party's Rajbir Singh by a margin of 1,688 votes, succeeding Santosh Chauhan Sarwan in the process.

In March 2021, Chaudhary was awarded the 'Best Legislator Award' for his contributions to the state's assembly.

References

Indian National Congress politicians from Haryana
Living people
Haryana MLAs 2019–2024
People from Ambala
Year of birth missing (living people)